Sasibuqa (1309–1315?) was the Khan of White Horde. He was one of Bayan's four sons. 
The rulers of the White Horde or the Left wing of the Golden horde issued decrees with the name of Khan in Sarai, though, they were reigning largely independent.

His son was muslim Ilbasan, also known as Irzan, another khan of the White Horde.

Genealogy
Genghis Khan
Jochi
Orda Khan
Sartaqtay
Köchü
Bayan
Sasibuqa

See also
List of Khans of the Golden Horde

References

Further reading 

 

Nomadic groups in Eurasia
Khans of the White Horde
14th-century Mongol rulers
Borjigin

kk:Сасы Бұқа хан